Streltsy Department or Streletsky Prikaz (Стрелецкий приказ in Russian) was one of the main governmental bodies in Russia in 16th and 17th centuries.

The first reference to the Streltsy Department (SD) appears in 1571, but in the mid-1550s it already existed under the name of Streletskaya izba (Стрелецкая изба), the Streltsy House.

SD was in charge of the Moscow and Municipal Streltsy, their lands and other property, disbursement of their salary and bread allowances, and their cases in court. In 1672-1683, SD also collected Streltsy's taxes. After the Streltsy Uprising in 1698, SD was engaged in regular administrative and managerial matters. In 1701, SD was transformed into the Department on the Matters of the Zemstvo (Приказ земских дел, or Prikaz zemskikh del), inheriting the functions of the Zemstvo Police Department in Moscow.

References

Further reading
 Богоявленский С. К. Московский приказной аппарат и делопроизводство XVI—XVII веков. Moscow, Языки славянской культуры. 2006. — 603 pp.;  
 Веселовский С. Б. Дьяки и подьячие XV—XVII веков. М. Наука. 1975. — 608 pp.
 Павлов А. П. Приказы и приказная бюрократия (1584—1605 гг.) // Исторические записки Института истории Академии наук СССР. Voil. 116. Moscow,  1988.
 Романов М. Ю. Стрельцы московские. Moscow, 2004. — 351 pp.

Tsardom of Russia